Highway 18 is an American reality television game show that premiered on Golf Channel on July 22, 2008 after being filmed in April 2008. Set in Florida, the series is hosted by Keri Murphy. The show features five teams of twosomes racing against each other in a series of challenges to complete a "Clubhouse Challenge" allowing them to move to the next round, in a format based on The Amazing Race. The show airs Tuesday nights at 10pm on Golf Channel.

Show format 
Each week, the five teams are given clues to a location to which they must all race. On arriving, they will have a challenge that will test one part of their golf game.

Once they complete this mini-challenge, they will be given clues to get to their next location. This could be another test, a quiz, or the Clubhouse Challenge.

Clubhouse Challenge 
The final showdown each week is the Clubhouse Challenge. The teams must play a hole, either both playing or alternating strokes, and complete the hole as quickly as possible. Once the hole is completed, they must rush back to the Clubhouse and retrieve a golf ball. The team who arrives last will lose that challenge. Losing a challenge once will give the team a strike, but losing a second time will be the end of the road for that team.

Locations 
Season 1
Week 1: TPC Sawgrass
Week 2: Golden Ocala Golf & Country Club
Week 3: LPGA International
Week 4: Champions Gate Golf Club
Week 5: Copperhead Course
Week 6: Sara Bay Country Club (Match play)

Teams 
Andy and Parker (eliminated first)
Raul and Jameica (eliminated second)
Jay and Peach (eliminated third)
Ashley and Ashleigh (eliminated fourth)
Rob and Charlotte (winners)

References

External links 
Website for Highway 18
Highway 18 @ IMDB

Highway 18
2000s American game shows
2010s American game shows
2008 American television series debuts
Television game shows with incorrect disambiguation